Love Is War is a 2019 Nigerian political drama film directed by Omoni Oboli and written by Chinaza Onuzo. It stars Oboli, Richard Mofe-Damijo, Jide Kosoko, Akin Lewis, Bimbo Manuel, Toke Makinwa, Shaffy Bello, Femi Branch, Uzo Osimkpa, Yemi Blaq, Damilare Kuku and William Benson. Produced by Inkblot Productions and Dioni Visions, Love Is War is the second collaboration between the two production companies following 2018's Moms at War. The film is centered around a married couple who run against each other for governor in the same state.

Cast

Omoni Oboli as Hankuri Philips
Richard Mofe-Damijo as Dimeji Phillips 
Jide Kosoko
Akin Lewis
Bimbo Manuel
Toke Makinwa
Shaffy Bello
Femi Branch
Uzo Osimkpa
Yemi Blaq
Damilare Kuku
William Benson
Genoveva Umeh

Production
Love Is War is a joint production between Oboli's Dioni Visions and Onuzo's Inkblot Productions. It was written by Onuzo, who previously worked on films such as The Wedding Party, New Money, Up North and The Set Up. The film explores the themes of love, family and ambition. Oboli announced on Instagram that filming for the movie commenced in May 2019. She also revealed that Richard Mofe-Damijo had joined the cast. In an interview with Pulse Nigeria in September 2019, Mofe-Damijo said he accepted his role because he loved the precedent upon which the film is set. He also said his political affiliation in real life helped him portray the role better. Moreover, Mofe-Damijo revealed that shooting was tedious due to the filming of night scenes.

Release
Love Is War premiered at the Filmhouse Cinemas in Lekki on September 22, 2019. It was released across cinemas in Nigeria on September 27. A teaser of the film was released a month earlier. Guests who attended the premiere include Ayo Makun, Funke Akindele, Toke Makinwa, Sharon Ooja, Alex Ekubo, Inidima Okojie, Mercy Aigbe, Tope Oshin and Sophie Alakija, among others.

References

Nigerian comedy-drama films
2019 comedy-drama films
2019 films
2010s English-language films